Uvariodendron pycnophyllum is a species of plant in the family Annonaceae. It is endemic to Tanzania.

References

Flora of Tanzania
pycnophyllum
Endangered plants
Taxonomy articles created by Polbot